The 1983 South African Open was a men's tennis tournament played on indoor hard courts in Johannesburg, South Africa that was part of the 1983 Volvo Grand Prix. It was the 80th open tennis tournament that was held between 22 and 27 November 1983. Sixth-seeded Johan Kriek won the singles title.

Finals

Singles
 Johan Kriek defeated  Colin Dowdeswell 6–4, 4–6, 1–6, 7–5, 6–3

Doubles
 Steve Meister /  Brian Teacher defeated  Andrés Gómez /  Sherwood Stewart 6–7, 7–6, 6–2

References

External links
 ITF – Johannesburg Tournament details

South African Open
South African Open
South African Open (tennis)
Open
Sports competitions in Johannesburg
1980s in Johannesburg
November 1983 sports events in Africa